Auróra is a cultural and community place located in the 8th district of Budapest, Hungary. A well-known site of the city's underground music and art scene, it also serves as a hub for Hungarian NGOs. Its organisational model is based on participative democracy. Auróra has been a well-known target for the Hungarian government's crackdown on civil organisations. It has been named after Károly Kisfaludy's literary journal of the same name.

Civil hub 
Auróra's first floor provides office space for several Hungarian non-governmental organisations. Currently the following NGOs have their headquarters in the building:
Alternatíva Alapítvány (Altalap)
Közélet Iskolája
atlatszo.hu (investigative newspaper)
Marom Egyesület
Utcajogász 
Pneuma Szöv. (Közmű Egyesület - Mókus csoport)
Roma Sajtóközpont (RSK)
Budapest Pride (Szivárvány Misszió Alapítvány)

References

External links
Official website
Auróra on WeLoveBudapest
Introducing Auróra: A Little-Known Ruin Bar In Budapest’s Mysterious 8th District

Culture in Budapest
Community centres
Józsefváros
2014 establishments in Hungary
Nightclubs in Budapest